Richard Wohl (1921 – November 15, 1957) was a sociologist known for coining the term "parasocial interactions" defined as a sense of friendship or relationship that viewers form with media personae. His influential paper, co-authored with Donald Horton, was published in 1956. He died of cancer in 1957.

References
 republished in Particip@tions 3 (1) 

1921 births
1957 deaths
American sociologists